Peter Charles Monty (born July 3, 1974, in Fort Collins, Colorado) is a former American football linebacker in the National Football League for the New York Giants and the Minnesota Vikings.  He played college football at the University of Wisconsin where his team won the 1994 Rose Bowl, and was then drafted in the fourth round of the 1997 NFL Draft.

1974 births
Living people
Sportspeople from Fort Collins, Colorado
American football linebackers
Wisconsin Badgers football players
New York Giants players
Minnesota Vikings players